"Kokomo" is a song by the American rock band the Beach Boys from the 1988 film  Cocktail and album Still Cruisin'. Written by John Phillips, Scott McKenzie, Mike Love, and Terry Melcher, the song was released as a single on June 21, 1988 by Elektra Records and became a number one hit in the U.S. and Australia. It was the band's first original Top 20 single in 20 years, their first #1 hit in 22 years. 

The lyrics describe two lovers taking a trip to a relaxing place on Kokomo, a utopic island off the Florida Keys. In addition to the fictional Kokomo, the song also makes references to many real Caribbean islands, including Aruba, Jamaica, Bermuda, Bahamas, Martinique, and Montserrat.

Background
The verse of the song came from a demo by John Phillips (formerly of the Mamas & the Papas) and Scott McKenzie (best known for his 1967 song “San Francisco (Be Sure To Wear Flowers In Your Hair)," which Phillips wrote). The Beach Boys' Mike Love added the chorus which lists the names of islands.

Recording
"Kokomo" was recorded on March 22 and April 5–6, 1988 with production by Terry Melcher, who had previously produced the band's "Rock 'n' Roll to the Rescue" (1986) and "California Dreamin'" (1986). It was created through overdubbing parts onto the band's demo for the song.

The recording featured every current member of the group except Brian Wilson, who did not attend the sessions. In his 1991 memoir Wouldn't It Be Nice: My Own Story, it was stated that Wilson was unable to contribute to the song because he was committed to recording his first solo album, and his bandmates deliberately did not inform him of the session date until it was too late. According to biographer Mark Dillon, "Available session-date information does not substantiate this claim, however."

Mike Love stated that Wilson was not on "Kokomo" because Eugene Landy, Wilson's therapist-turned-collaborator, refused to "let Brian sing on it unless Landy was a producer and co-writer" and Melcher did not "feel he needed Landy since he had produced some number-one records. It was pathetic of Landy to do that, but he controlled Brian completely at that time." According to a 2018 article in Stereogum, "When [Brian] first heard the song on the radio, he didn’t even recognize it as a Beach Boys tune." The group later recorded a Spanish-language version of "Kokomo" with participation from Wilson.

Music video
The video for "Kokomo" was filmed at the then-recently opened Grand Floridian Resort at Walt Disney World in Florida. Although they had not played these instruments on the recording, Mike Love is seen playing saxophone, while actor and occasional Beach Boys live guest John Stamos is shown playing steel drum.

In 2011, NME ranked the video as the 17th worst of all time, commenting, "It was as if Mike Love had taken the 'Beach Boys' name straight out of Brian Wilson's hands and we were forced to watch footage of Tom Cruise mixing up Bloody Marys. Thanks guys."

Release
After being released as a single in 1988, the song was included on the soundtrack album for the movie Cocktail as well as the 1989 Beach Boys album Still Cruisin'.

"Kokomo" was nominated for the Grammy Award for Best Song Written Specifically for a Motion Picture or Television in 1988, but lost to Phil Collins' "Two Hearts" (from the film Buster). "Two Hearts" and Carly Simon's "Let the River Run" from Working Girl jointly beat it for the Golden Globe Award for Best Original Song.

Critical reception
In spite of its commercial success, "Kokomo" has attracted mostly negative reviews from music writers. Jimmy Guterman of Rolling Stone wrote that the song "sets the pattern for the new, passion-free songs" on Still Cruisin', while the Rolling Stone album guide called it a "joyless ditty". In a 1998 piece, Steve Simels of Stereo noted "just how insipid 'Kokomo' was". Blender stated the song was "perhaps most kindly described as a Beach Boys–influenced song with the Beach Boys singing on it." Cash Box called it a "snappy little throw-back of a tune" with "a real islands-vibe and hooky chorus."

In the years following its release, "Kokomo" has become notorious for its perceived poor quality: as Tom Breihan of Stereogum writes, "People hate 'Kokomo.' The Beach Boys' improbable late-career hit has a reputation as a monument to mediocrity. To this day, it serves as a textbook cautionary tale of a once-beloved group poisoning its own legacy and goodwill by making smarmy '80s yuppie pablum." In a retrospective dubbing the song the "worst summer song ever", MEL Magazines Tim Grierson similarly noted, "A lot of us have taken immense delight in hating this 1988 smash." As such, it has appeared on several worst songs of all time lists, such as Blenders top 50 worst songs, Dallas Observers ten worst songs by great artists, and Forbes worst lyrics of all time. Both Breihan and Grierson attribute the personal unpopularity of Mike Love as a possible factor for the song's reputation.

Drummer Jim Keltner, who played on "Kokomo", attributed the critical disdain to the fact that "it's just sooo syrupy pop." He continued, "But while the critics killed it with their words, they couldn't kill the 'hitness' of it. It's just a bona fide hit record, that's all there is to it."

Track listings
3-inch CD single
 "Kokomo" – 3:34
 "Tutti Frutti" performed by Little Richard – 2:23
 "Hippy Hippy Shake" performed by The Georgia Satellites – 1:45

7-inch single
 "Kokomo" – 3:34
 "Tutti Frutti" performed by Little Richard – 2:23

12-inch maxi
 "Kokomo" – 3:34
 "Tutti Frutti" performed by Little Richard – 2:23
 "Hippy Hippy Shake" performed by The Georgia Satellites – 1:45

Personnel
Per Mark Dillon and engineer Keith Wechsler.

The Beach Boys
 Al Jardine – vocals
 Bruce Johnston – vocals
 Mike Love – vocals
 Carl Wilson – vocals

Additional musicians
 Chili Charles – percussion
 Rod Clark – bass guitar 
 Jeffrey Foskett – acoustic guitar
 Jim Keltner – drums
 Milton and Mike (surnames unknown) – steel drums
 Van Dyke Parks — accordion
 Joel Peskin – saxophone

Charts

Weekly charts

Year-end charts

Certifications

References
Citations

Bibliography

Further reading
 
 
 

1988 singles
1988 songs
Billboard Hot 100 number-one singles
Cashbox number-one singles
Number-one singles in Australia
The Beach Boys songs
Songs written for films
Songs written by Mike Love
Songs written by Terry Melcher
Song recordings produced by Terry Melcher
Songs written by John Phillips (musician)
Songs written by Scott McKenzie
Elektra Records singles
Capitol Records singles
Songs about islands